Frederick Trench, 1st Baron Ashtown (17 September 1755 – 1 May 1840) was an Irish politician.

He was the son of Frederick Trench and Mary (née Sadleir). The Trench family were of French descent. He was elected to represent Portarlington from 1798 to the Act of Union in 1801. On 27 December 1800 he was raised to the Peerage of Ireland as Baron Ashtown, of Moate in the County of Galway, with remainder to the heirs male of his father Frederick Trench. This was a so-called "Union peerage", a reward for Trench's support for the Union between Ireland and Great Britain, which he had initially opposed. He had been elected for the Portarlington constituency in the post-Union parliament at Westminster, but the creation of the peerage prevented him taking his seat and so he never sat in Westminster.

Lord Ashtown married Elizabeth, daughter of Robert Robinson, in 1785. They had no children. He died in May 1840, aged 84, and was succeeded in the barony according to the special remainder by his nephew Frederick. Lady Ashtown died in 1844.

References

1755 births
1840 deaths
Frederick 1
Peers of Ireland created by George III
Irish MPs 1798–1800
Trench, 1st Baron Ashtown, Frederick
Frederick
Members of the Parliament of the United Kingdom for Portarlington
Members of the Parliament of Ireland (pre-1801) for Portarlington
Members of the Parliament of Ireland (pre-1801) for Queen's County constituencies